Malmön is a locality situated in Sotenäs Municipality, Västra Götaland County, Sweden.

References 

Populated places in Västra Götaland County
Populated places in Sotenäs Municipality